Hygroplasta onyxijuxta is a moth in the family Lecithoceridae. It was described by Chun-Sheng Wu and Kyu-Tek Park in 1998. It is found in Sri Lanka.

The wingspan is about 10 mm. The forewings are ochreous with small spots. The hindwings are ochreous.

Etymology
The species name is derived from Greek onyx (meaning claw) and juxta.

References

Moths described in 1998
Hygroplasta